The Badyarikha (Bacaariixa) is a river in Yakutia in Russia, a right tributary of the Indigirka. Its sources are located on the northern slopes of the Moma Range 

The Badyarikha flows on the eastern side of the Aby Lowland. Its main tributaries are the rivers Ogorokha, Orto-Tirekhtyakh, and Anty.

References

Rivers of the Sakha Republic